The , commonly referred to as the National Security Advisor of Japan, is the head of the National Security Secretariat, a department within the Cabinet Secretariat in charge of the National Security Council.  As the principal advisor to the Prime Minister on matters regarding national security, the Director-General is one of the most senior officials in the Prime Minister’s Office. The Director-General is appointed and serves at the pleasure of the Prime Minister.

The current Director-General is former Vice-Minister for Foreign Affairs, Takeo Akiba, who took office on 7 July, 2021.

List of Director-General's

References 

National security institutions
2013 establishments in Japan